John D. Hood is an American medical physiologist and pharmacologist and the founder and chief executive officer of Impact Biomedicines Inc.

Education and career 
Hood received his B.S. in biochemistry and obtained his Ph.D. in medical physiology from Texas A&M University.

Hood started his career as a Director of Research at TargeGen Inc . He was the co-founder and chief scientific officer of Samumed, a private biopharmaceutical company. Now, he is Board Chairman and Co-founder at Endeavor Biomedicines.

Research 
Hood did research on the development of TG101348 for the treatment of JAK2-driven malignancies and found that TG101348 blocked proliferation and colony formation in vitro against cultured and patient-derived cells bearing the JAK2v617F mutations. He also conducted research on tumor regression by targeted gene delivery to the Neovasculature.

Patents
Hood's patents include  3-(1H-imidazo[4,5-C]pyridin-2-yl)-1H-pyrazolo[3,4-B]pyridine and therapeutic uses thereof (US9889140B2), Indazole-3-carboxamides and their use as Wnt/beta-catenin signaling pathway inhibitors (US9802916B2), Indazole inhibitors of the Wnt signal pathway and therapeutic uses thereof (US9763927B2), β- and γ-diketones and γ-hydroxy ketones as WNT/β-catenin signaling pathway activators (US9884053B2), and 1H-pyrazolo[3,4-B]pyridines and therapeutic uses thereof (US9855272B2)

Most cited peer-reviewed articles

 Hood JD, Cheresh DA. Role of integrins in cell invasion and migration. Nature Reviews Cancer. 2002 Feb;2(2):91-100. According to Google Scholar, this article has been cited 1991 times
Hood JD, Bednarski M, Frausto R, Guccione S, Reisfeld RA, Xiang R, Cheresh DA. Tumor regression by targeted gene delivery to the neovasculature. Science. 2002 Jun 28;296(5577):2404-7.. According to Google Scholar, this article has been cited 1015 times.
Eliceiri BP, Paul R, Schwartzberg PL, Hood JD, Leng J, Cheresh DA. Selective requirement for Src kinases during VEGF-induced angiogenesis and vascular permeability. Molecular cell. 1999 Dec 1;4(6):915-24. . According to Google Scholar, this article has been cited 856 times.
Hood JD, Meininger CJ, Ziche M, Granger HJ. VEGF upregulates ecNOS message, protein, and NO production in human endothelial cells. American Journal of Physiology. Heart and Circulatory Physiology. 1998 Mar 1;274(3):H1054-8. According to Google Scholar, this article has been cited 828 times.

References 

Living people
Year of birth missing (living people)
Place of birth missing (living people)
American physiologists
American pharmacists
Texas A&M University alumni
American company founders
American chief executives
American medical researchers